is a railway station on the Seibu Ikebukuro Line in Toshima, Tokyo, Japan, operated by the private railway operator Seibu Railway.

Lines
Only all-stations "Local" services stop at this station.

Station layout
The station has two ground-level side platforms serving two tracks.

Platforms

History

Shiinamachi Station opened on 11 June 1924. The name was taken from the original name of the district in which the station was located, although it is now named Nagasaki.

Station numbering was introduced during fiscal 2012, with Shiinamachi Station becoming "SI02".

Passenger statistics
In fiscal 2013, the station was the 55th busiest on the Seibu network with an average of 18,664 passengers daily.

The passenger figures for previous years are as shown below.

References

External links

 Shiinamachi Station information (Seibu Railway) 

Railway stations in Japan opened in 1924
Seibu Ikebukuro Line
Railway stations in Tokyo